WCSL may refer to:

ICC Cricket World Cup Super League
Women's Cricket Super League
WCSL (AM), a radio station (1590 AM) licensed to serve Cherryville, North Carolina